Karen Yu (born 11 June 1980) is a Taiwanese politician. She served a single term on the Legislative Yuan as a member of the Democratic Progressive Party.

Early life
Yu obtained her bachelor's degree in economics from National Taiwan University and master's degree in anthropology from University of London in the United Kingdom.

Pre-political career
She founded the cafe OKOGreen in 2008. The establishment served only coffee produced through fair trade practices, and supported environmentalism by partnering with Green Party Taiwan and the Taiwan Environmental Information Center. Yu has also served on the council of the Taiwan Fairtrade Association.

Political career
Yu was co-chair of Green Party Taiwan from 2012 to 2015. She was listed eighth on the Democratic Progressive Party's proportional representation ballot during the 2016 legislative elections and won an at-large seat in the Legislative Yuan. After stepping down as a legislator, she was appointed director general of the Taoyuan City Government's Department of Information Technology.

References

1980 births
Living people
Taiwanese environmentalists
Democratic Progressive Party Members of the Legislative Yuan
Party List Members of the Legislative Yuan
Members of the 9th Legislative Yuan
Alumni of the University of London
National Taiwan University alumni
Taiwanese women environmentalists